The Worcester Palladium, also known as The Palladium or Palladium Theatre, is an all-ages concert hall and performance venue located in Worcester, Massachusetts. The Palladium was designed by architect Arlan W. Johnson and opened as a theatre in 1928 as the Plymouth Theatre.  It has a seating capacity of 2,160 in the Main Room and 500 in the upstairs room and is a popular venue for rock and metal bands.

Since 1990, the booking agency MassConcerts has handled all booking for The Palladium; artists that have performed here include Blink-182, Bring Me the Horizon, Chelsea Grin, Ensiferum, Evanescence, Fall Out Boy, Four Year Strong, Gov't Mule, Gwar, Hatebreed, Ice Nine Kills, Jerry Garcia Band, Jimmy Eat World, Kanye West, King Diamond, Korn, Logic, Motionless in White, My Chemical Romance, Nightwish, Of Mice & Men, Palaye Royale, Periphery, The Three Stooges, Protest the Hero, Rammstein, Reveille, Rob Zombie, Senses Fail, Slayer, Sonata Arctica, Soundgarden, Straight Line Stitch, Suicide Silence, Twelve Foot Ninja, Twenty One Pilots, Tyler The Creator, Whitechapel, Wiz Khalifa, and Years Since the Storm.

A live concert DVD by The Devil Wears Prada titled Dead & Alive was filmed at the Palladium on December 14, 2011.

History

The Plymouth Theatre, originally leased by Alfred Gottesman Theatrical Enterprises, Inc., is situated at the corner of Main St. and Central St. and was first opened on November 24, 1928—"Doors open at 7 P.M.", "Curtain at 8 o'clock"—according to the bill in the Evening Gazette's News Notes of Worcester Stage and Screen.

For the inaugural performances, the theater presented a "scene of beauty" to its guests—the foyer was decorated with about 100 baskets of roses and other flowers (gifts of some of the leading business establishments of the time), while the stage was banked with palms and flowers. Mr. Alfred Gottesman, lessee of The Plymouth, gave his personal supervision to the plans for the theater and had invited many of the night's guests personally.

The theater opened with a Robert Morton pipe organ; the opening bill for the theater advertises "". As of 2008 the organ had been purchased and installed in a private residence.

The building was renamed the E.M. Loew's Center for the Performing Arts on April 14, 1980, and by 1990 became The Palladium.  In July 2012, owners John Fischer and John Sousa filed a waiver to Worcester's demolition delay ordinance after receiving an increase in the Palladium's property taxes.

References

Buildings and structures in Worcester, Massachusetts
Culture of Worcester, Massachusetts
Music venues in Massachusetts
Theatres completed in 1928
1928 establishments in Massachusetts